László Hidvéghy (9 November 1910 – 11 October 1989) was a Hungarian speed skater. He competed in three events at the 1936 Winter Olympics.

References

1910 births
1989 deaths
Hungarian male speed skaters
Olympic speed skaters of Hungary
Speed skaters at the 1936 Winter Olympics
Speed skaters from Budapest